My First Forty Years (also known as My Wonderful Life) is a 1987 Italian comedy film  directed by Carlo Vanzina and starring Carol Alt, Elliott Gould and Jean Rochefort. It is loosely based on the autobiography of Marina Ripa Di Meana.

Plot 
Italy late 1980s. Determined not to remain an unknown woman, Marina gives rise to fame going from one room to another bed, from one scandal to another. She married a penniless duke then loves a journalist, an artist and a politician.

Cast 

Carol Alt as Marina Caracciolo 
Elliott Gould as  Nino Ranuzzi
Jean Rochefort as  Prince Riccio
Pierre Cosso as  Duke Massimiliano Caracciolo Villalta
Capucine as  Princess Caracciolo Villalta
Teo Teocoli as  Franco Bonetti
Isabel Russinova as  Doris Caetani
Paola Quattrini as  Marina's Mother 
Riccardo Garrone as  Marina's Father
Sebastiano Somma as  Rodolfo Merisi 
Massimo Venturiello as  Roberto D'Angelo
Giuseppe Pambieri as  Carlo Donati Dadda
Martine Brochard as  Marquise Caetani
Carlo Monni as The Proprietor

References

External links

1987 comedy films
1987 films
Films directed by Carlo Vanzina
Italian comedy films
Italian biographical films
1980s Italian-language films
Cultural depictions of Italian women
1980s Italian films